Kromfontein Middle Cofferdam is an earthfill type dam located on the Steenkool Spruit, near Witbank, Mpumalanga, South Africa. It was established in 1990 and serves primarily for flood storage (retention) and river diversion. The hazard potential of the dam has been ranked significant (2).

See also
List of reservoirs and dams in South Africa
List of rivers of South Africa

References 

 List of South African Dams from the Department of Water Affairs and Forestry (South Africa)

Dams in South Africa
Dams completed in 1990